Erigeron piperianus is a species of flowering plant in the family Asteraceae known by the common name Piper's fleabane. It has been found only in the state of Washington in the northwestern United States.

Erigeron piperianus is a small perennial herb rarely more than 12 centimeters (4.8 inches) tall, producing a woody taproot. The plant generally produces only 1 flower head per stem. Each head has 25–40 yellow ray florets surrounding numerous yellow disc florets. The plant grows in dry, open, relatively flat land, often with sagebrush.

References

External links
Photo of herbarium specimen at Missouri Botanical Garden, collected in Washington in 1935, isotype of Erigeron piperianus

piperianus
Plants described in 1947
Flora of Washington (state)
Taxa named by Arthur Cronquist